The Compton Baronetcy, of Hartbury in the County of Gloucester, was a title in the Baronetage of England.  It was created on 6 May 1686 for William Compton.  The title became extinct on the death of the fifth Baronet in 1773.

Compton baronets, of Hartbury (1686)
Sir William Compton, 1st Baronet (died )
Sir William Compton, 2nd Baronet (died 1731)
Sir William Compton, 3rd Baronet (died 1758)
Sir William Compton, 4th Baronet (died 1760)
Sir Walter Abingdon Compton, 5th Baronet (died 1773)

References

Extinct baronetcies in the Baronetage of England